Ole Thomsen (born 28 November 1952 in Bergen, Norway) is a Norwegian jazz musician (guitar) and composer, known from a number of releases and since 1977 central on the Bergen jazz scene. He is the older brother of another Bergen Guitarist, Kåre Thomsen.

Career

The Jazz fusion inspired Thomson has contributed on at least 19 releases, such as in The Gambian/Norwegian Friendship Orchestra, Orchestra Ny Bris with Olav Dale, Per Jørgensen, Frank Jakobsen,
Kåre Garnes og Dag Arnesen and Thomsens Loosebox with Ivar Kolve, Stein Inge Brækhus and Yngve Moe. From 1987 he led the band Hot Cargo, with Stein Inge Brækhus (drums), Olav Dale (saxophone), and Geir Rognø (bass) for the 1992 recording, and led the Ole Thomsen Group with Ingolv Haaland (piano), Stein Inge Brækhus (drums), Asbjørn Sundal (bass) and Torbjørn Hillersøy (bass). He also led the bands "Hot Cargo" at the Nattjazz 1988–95, and "Electric Heavyland" with co-musicians Harald Dahlstrøm (hammond organ), Øivind Lunde (bass guitar), Frank Jakobsen (drums), at the Nattjazz 1993.

Thomsen has featured on recordings with, among others, Ole Amund Gjersvik, Wenche Gausdal Kvintett, Dag Arnesen, Bergen Blues Band, Ove Thue, Kari Bremnes, Ole Paus, Hans Inge Fagervik.

Discography
1981: Doktor Larsen (Sonet Records), with Doktor Larsen
1982: Ny Bris (Odin Records), with Dag Arnesen's Ny Bris
1982: Another Blues (Harvest, EMI Norway), with Bergen Blues Band
1982: The Gambian/Norwegian Friendship Orchestra (Odin Records)
1983: Blues Hit Me (Harvest, EMI Norway), with Bergen Blues Band
1988: Invisible dances, commissioned for Vossajazz, with the stage artist Nina Seim and musicians Helge Lilletvedt, Per Jørgensen, Yngve Moe & Stein Inge Brækhus
1992: Hot Cargo (NorCD), with Hot Cargo
1992: Nattjazz 20 År (Grappa Music), compilation with various artists
1996: Ankle deep, bestillingsverk til Nattjazz
1996: Forever Like A Child (ESR), with Eivind Løberg
2003: Adventures in European New Jazz And Improvised Music (Europe Jazz Oddysey), with Bergen Big Band fest. Mathias Rüegg "Art & Fun" on compilation with various artists
2004: Nærhet (Taurus Records), with Wenche Gausdal 
2005: Seagull (Grappa Music), with Bergen Big Band feat. Karin Krog, directed by John Surman
2007: Meditations on Coltrane (Grappa Music), with Bergen Big Band feat. The Core
2008: Som den gyldne sol frembryter (Grappa Music), with Bergen Big Band
2010: Crime Scene (ECM Records), live with Bergen Big Band feat. Terje Rypdal
2012: Algeria (Losen Records), with Wenche Gausdal

Awards
''Vossajazz Award" 1989

References

External links

Bluesjam with Boss RC-2, Zendrive, Paul Reed Smith, Suhr pickups on YouTube
Light at The Edge of the World – Ole Thomsen – Voksne Herrers Orkester on YouTube

20th-century Norwegian guitarists
21st-century Norwegian guitarists
Jazz-rock guitarists
Norwegian jazz guitarists
Norwegian jazz composers
Musicians from Bergen
1952 births
Living people
20th-century guitarists
Bergen Big Band members